Prayanam (English: Travel) is a 2009 Telugu film starring Manoj Manchu in the lead role; Payal Ghosh is female lead. The film was written and directed by Chandra Sekhar Yeleti and produced by Seeta Yeleti. The movie received positive reviews. The story is said revolve around Manoj and Payal Ghosh in an airport. It was considered as a "below average" by box office India,

Plot
This is a story of a boy and girl who meet for the first time in an airport and fall in love before they board their flights. Dhruv is the boy and Harika is the girl. They are distinctive individuals. Dhruv is a kind of boy who loves to take chances in life. Harika is one who likes to make right choices in life. She is doing a Masters in Lifestyles Design Academy in Malaysia. Right now she is on her way to India to meet a prospective groom whom her parents have chosen for her.

Dhruv falls in love at first sight with Harika when he sees her at the airport. But he has only two hours to make her fall in love with him. The rest of the story is about how he succeeds.

Cast
 Manoj Manchu as Dhruv
 Payal Ghosh as Harika
 Brahmanandam as Satyanarayana Swamy
 Aamir Tameem as Raman
 Janardhan as Kailash
 Kalpika Ganesh as Moksha

Filming
Most of the movie takes place in the Kuala Lumpur International Airport.

Critical reception

Prayanam received positive reviews from critics.

Soundtrack

The soundtrack features three songs (two bit songs) composed by Mahesh Shankar with lyrics by Ananta Sriram.

Eleven-year-old Amruthavarshini was nominated for 57th Filmfare Award (South) in the 'Best Female Playback' category (Telugu) for the song "Meghamaa".

References

External links

2000s Telugu-language films
Films directed by Chandra Sekhar Yeleti